Bloodshot is the third studio album by American rock band The J. Geils Band. The album was released on April 12, 1973, by Atlantic Records. It was the breakthrough release for the band, reaching #10 on the Billboard 200 album chart in the United States, a peak that the band would not surpass until their 1981 multi-platinum album Freeze Frame. The single version of "Give it to Me", which had a very different ending from the album version, reached #30 on the U.S. Billboard Hot 100 and #15 on the Cash Box Top 100.

Original US vinyl copies of Bloodshot were issued using red vinyl instead of the customary black, and utilized matching red 1950s style Atlantic Records labels. The band would continue to use these vintage-style Atlantic labels, in different colors with each album release, throughout their remaining tenure with the label.

Track listing
All songs written by Seth Justman and Peter Wolf, except where noted.

Personnel
Peter Wolf – lead vocals
J. Geils – guitar
Magic Dick – harmonica
Seth Justman – keyboards
Danny Klein – bass
Stephen Jo Bladd – drums

Additional personnel
Mike Hunt – saxophone

Production
Bill Szymczyk – producer, engineer
Allan Blazek – assistant producer
George Marino – digital remastering
Juke Joint Jimmy – special assistance
J. Geils – arranger
Richard Mantel – design
David Gahr – photography

Charts
Album

Singles

References

1973 albums
The J. Geils Band albums
Albums produced by Bill Szymczyk
Atlantic Records albums